Tazeh Kand-e Hajji Khan (also Romanized as Tāzeh Kand-e Ḩājjī Khān; also known as Tāzeh Kand) is a village in Shaban Rural District, in the Central District of Meshgin Shahr County, Ardabil Province, Iran. At the 2006 census, its population was 33, in 7 families.

References 

Towns and villages in Meshgin Shahr County